Iman Hasan Mohammed Al-Rufaye (born 16 February 1982), also known as Eman Hassane Al-Rufei, is an Iraqi chess player who holds the FIDE title of Woman International Master (WIM). She is a Women's Chess Olympiads individual gold (1998) and silver (2000, 2006) medals winner.

Biography
Since the late 1990s, Al-Rufaye has been one of the leading Iraqi chess players. She received the Woman FIDE Master (WFM) title in 1999 and the Woman International Master (WIM) title in 2001. In 2012, she won the Iraqi Women's Chess Championship with a hundred percent score - 9 out of 9 possible. In 2014, Al-Rufaye won 3rd place in Arab League Women's Chess Championship. In 2016, she ranked 28th in Asian Women's Chess Championship.

Al-Rufaye played for Iraq in the Women's Chess Olympiads:
 In 1998, at second board in the 33rd Chess Olympiad (women) in Elista (+7, =2, -0) and won individual gold medal,
 In 2000, at second board in the 34th Chess Olympiad (women) in Istanbul (+6, =4, -0) and won individual silver medal,
 In 2006, at first board in the 37th Chess Olympiad (women) in Turin (+7, =0, -1) and won individual silver medal,
 In 2012, at first board in the 40th Chess Olympiad (women) in Istanbul (+6, =2, -3),
 In 2016, at second board in the 42nd Chess Olympiad (women) in Baku (+5 =2, -3).

She also played for Iraq in the Pan Arab Games:
 In 2007, at first board in the 11th Pan Arab Games (women) in Cairo (+4, =0, -1) and won individual gold medal,
 In 2011, at second board in the 12th Pan Arab Games (women) in Doha (+6, =0, -1) and team bronze and individual gold medals.

References

External links
  (archive)
 
  (2016)
  (1998–2008)
 

1982 births
Living people
Iraqi chess players
Chess Woman International Masters
Chess Olympiad competitors